Nałęcza  is a village in the administrative district of Gmina Szamocin, within Chodzież County, Greater Poland Voivodeship, in west-central Poland. It had a population of 319 in 2006.

References

Villages in Chodzież County